Coisas is an album by Brazilian composer Moacir Santos recorded in 1965 and released on the Forma record label. The album was listed by Ben Ratliff in his 100 most important recordings and by Rolling Stone in their 100 Greatest Brazilian Music Records.

Reception 
Although the album was not met with acclaim when first released, it has gone on to receive praise. The New York Times described the album as "one of the great accomplishments of modern Brazilian music". Writing for the Village Voice,  Larry Blumenfeld called the album a "brilliant record". Ben Ratliff wrote that the album sounds like it was a mixture of West Coast jazz and samba and the arrangements on Blue Note recordings. Ratliff had earlier described the album as "a brilliant unification of large-ensemble jazz arranging, wickedly persuasive songwriting and Afro-Brazilian rhythm." The Allmusic review by Thom Jurek awarded the album 4½ stars, writing that the album "melds the various tonalities and flavors of creative jazz to the heart of Brazil's folkloric and emergent musical traditions."

Original copies of the album are hard to find with records selling for large amounts of money.

The song “Coisa No. 5” was later given lyrics by Mario Telles and renamed “Nanã”. The song has been recorded by over 100 artists including Edison Machado, Eumir Deodato and Sergio Mendes.

Track listing 

 Coisa nº 4 (Moacir Santos) - 04:03
 Coisa nº 10 (Mário Telles - Moacir Santos) - 02:47
 Coisa nº 5 (Mário Telles - Moacir Santos) - 02:27
 Coisa nº 3 (Moacir Santos) - 02:20
 Coisa nº 2 (Moacir Santos) - 02:43
 Coisa nº 9 (Moacir Santos) 04:57
 Coisa nº 6 (Moacir Santos)
 Coisa nº 7 (Moacir Santos) - 03:06
 Coisa nº 1 (Clóvis Mello - Moacir Santos)  - 03:00
 Coisa nº 8 (Regina Werneck - Moacir Santos) - 03:08

Personnel 

 Moacir Santos - Baritone Saxophone
 Dulcilando Pereira - Alto Saxophone
 Jorge Ferreira Da Silva - Alto Saxophone
 Geraldo Medeiros - Baritone Saxophone
 Gabriel Bezerra - Bass
 Armando Pallas - Bass Trombone
 Giorgio Bariola - Cello
 Peter Dautsberg - Cello
 Watson Clis - Cello
 Wilson Das Neves - Drums
 Alberto Soluri - Engineer
 Nicolino Cópia - Flute
 Geraldo Vaspar - Guitar
 Wadi Gebara Netto - Music Director, Recording Supervisor
 Elias Ferreira - Percussion
 Chaim Lewak - Piano, Organ
 Luiz Bezerra - Tenor Saxophone
 Edmundo Maciel - Trombone
 João Gerônimo Meneze - Trumpet
 Júlio Barbosa - Trumpet
 Claudio Das Neves - Vibraphone

References 

Jazz albums by Brazilian artists
Moacir Santos albums
1965 albums